The Big Lurch is a theoretical scientific model suggested as one of the possibilities for ultimate fate of the universe.  Matter works itself up into a frenzy and forces governing the universe grow infinitely, building up infinite pressure while the density and cosmic expansion rate remain in steady state. The consequences for time are unclear in this scenario. According to astronomical calculations, there is a finite probability of this scenario actually happening relatively soon, in as little as a few million years.

See also

 Big Bang
 Big Brake
 Big Crunch
 Big Freeze
 Big Rip

References

Physical cosmology
Ultimate fate of the universe